is a 1989 Japanese science fiction tokusatsu mecha action film directed by Masato Harada.

Plot

Prologue
In the early 2030s, a new material called Texmexium (more powerful than nuclear energy) enabled the world to be controlled by a new generation of super computers. Due to fear of misusing Texmexium, it was guarded within hyper-nuclear facilities that powered every major city. Concurrently occurring was the world's depletion in raw materials to create new all-powerful computers; conductive plastics and computer chips have out-valued gold and gave rise to tech scavengers that seek their fortunes through acquiring and selling computer parts despite the extreme dangers.

During the year 2005, the Cybortech Company built one of the most advanced robotics development facilities upon a small Asian island simply called 8JO. Controlled by a highly advanced A.I.system, Kyron-5, the A.I. autonomously ran the island for 20 years until it come to realize humanity wasn't needed and began to use their own technologies to rebel against humanity; the great robot war began. To quell Kyron-5's insurrection, the allied powers dispatched a GUNHED battalion in attempt to stop Kyron-5; however, it was being protected by a powerful guardian, Aerobot. The battalion was defeated and all of its remains were thrown in a scrap yard. The conflict never had a clear victor, but the world allies chose to leave 8JO alone, it would be 13 years later for anyone to discover Kyron-5's survival and true intentions.

Main events
The year is now 2038, the scavenger crew of the Mary Ann has infiltrated 8JO and begins their mission to scavenge computer chips. Captain Bansho, Brooklyn, Babe, Barabbas, and Bombbay infiltrate the lower decks while Boomerang and Boxer monitor things near the Mary Ann. Before long, Boxer and Boomerang are killed by the automated defenses on the landing pad. As the infiltration team heads deeper into Kyron-5, Bansho and Barabbas are killed inside the elevator by the defenses. Brooklyn, Babe, and Bombbay manage to survive the assault and bump into an injured Texas Air Ranger, Sgt. Nim.

Nim was on a mission with her partner to hunt down a Bio-Droid that stole a vial of Texmexium for Kyron-5, but her helicopter was destroyed and her partner killed in action. Nim herself was injured and Brooklyn helped her. The four traveled together for safety, but Bombbay is soon killed by the droid Nim was hunting. The surviving trio made it to Kyron-5's core room, where they found a vial of Texmexium; the Bio-Droid wanted it back. While fighting for the Texmexium, Babe falls into a vat of chemicals along with the droid. Brooklyn and Nim believe her dead, but she actually somehow merged with the droid as a single conflicting entity. As the only two survivors, Brooklyn wants to keep the Texmexium because it cost him his comrades, but Nim wants it to complete her mission; both objectives have to put on hold as they encounter Aerobot.

The two survived their encounter with Aerobot by escaping into a deep chute, to be discovered by the sole surviving children of the original human custodians of Kyron-5, Seven (younger brother) and Eleven (mute older sister). Together, they formulated a plan to get back on the landing pad of Kyron-5 and escape with the Mary Ann, but their situation is hampered by both Kyron-5 and the Bio-Droid after them. However, it was by chance, at the robot graveyard, that Brooklyn found the remains of a GUNHED (Gun UNit of Heavy Eliminate Device).

Using his technical skills, Brooklyn brought GUNHED back online and it was through GUNHED that the crew learned that Kyron-5 only stopped conflicting with humanity 13 years ago to wait for them to complete developing Texmexium for its plans for global domination. Despite learning the threat it could pose to humanity, Nim was focused only on her mission and leaving the facility. Nim and Eleven left together for the Kyron-5 core room, while Seven stayed with Brooklyn to complete repairs on GUNHED and used it to escape Kyron-5. Brooklyn has personal anxieties about piloting, but he had to overcome it to survive. It was while during her leave that the droid found her and retaken the Texmexium to aid Kyron-5's plan.

With the aid of GUNHED, Brooklyn is able to clear the various deadly obstacles and defenses of Kyron-5. However, Aerobot remains at large. Brooklyn fights with GUNHED to take down Aerobot, but the unit defeats GUNHED. Brooklyn escapes from the tank and rigs a part of its functional gun to manually shoot Aerobot, with which she manages to finally destroy Aerobot once and for all. In between, Nim realized Eleven was part of Kyron-5's plan as it had actually inserted a special activation code within her (the source of her muteness); she would uncontrollably help Kyron-5 execute its plans, however, Nim intervened and prevented her from launching the code. The Bio-Droid returns to stop everyone, but Babe realizes she cannot escape being trapped inside and decides to detonate a grenade within the droid's body to help the four escape; both the droid and Babe are destroyed.

Kyron-5's plans have failed and now it activates the self-destruction sequence to detonate 8JO. Originally only having 10 seconds, the mangled GUNHED activates its boosters to ram Kyron-5 to give them a chance to escape within 15 minutes. With just enough time to escape, the four escape on board the Mary Ann and fly away. While flying away GUNHED passes its final message to Brooklyn, that the GUNHED Battalion has completed its mission.

Cast
 Masahiro Takashima as Brooklyn
 Brenda Bakke as Sergeant Nim, Texas Air Ranger
 Aya Enjōji as Bebe
 Eugene Harada as Seven
 Kaori Mizushima as Eleven
 Brewster Thompson as Barabbas James
 Doll Nguyen as Boomerang
 Jay Kabira as Bombbay
 Randy Reyes as Gunhed (Voice)
 Mickey Curtis as Bansho, the captain of the Mary Ann
  as Boxer
 Michael Yancy as the Narrator

Release
Gunhed was released theatrically on July 22, 1989, in Japan where it was distributed by Toho. In the Philippines, the film was released as Killer Tank on December 17, 1992. It was released in the United Kingdom in 1994. Gunhed was released in the United States by ADV Films in both an English dub and English subtitled format on November 30, 2004.

Reception
In a contemporary review, Derek Elley wrote in Variety that the film was "derivative of films by Ridley Scott and James Cameron" and described Gunhed as "hokey" and critiqued "cheesy dialogue", "unflashy f/x" and "a bland pop-synth soundtrack" while noting "good model work". Elley concluded that in Gunhed, "Things pick up in the final half-hour, which eventually delivers the action goods without springing any major surprises."

From retrospective reviews, Donald C. Willis wrote about the film in his book Horror and Science Fiction Film IV, specifying that Gunhed was a "exuberant action/effects spectacular" with "an effect-a-second pace and an Alien, lost-in-technology feel to its human interaction." The Time Out Film Guide referred the film as "impenetrable tosh (at least in the English version)".

Video games
There are two video games based on Gunhed:

Blazing Lazers (Gunhed), released for the PC Engine (TurboGrafx-16) in 1989.
Gunhed: The New Battle, released for the Famicom (Nintendo Entertainment System) in 1990.
 The Gunhed and Brooklyn were featured as downloadable content in Super Robot Wars X-Ω, the 2015 IOS Android installment of Bandai Namco Entertainment's tactical role-playing crossover Mecha game franchise, Super Robot Wars.

Footnotes

References

External links
 

Mecha films
1980s science fiction action films
1980s monster movies
1989 films
Cyberpunk films
Cyborg films
Films credited to Alan Smithee
Films directed by Masato Harada
Films set in 2005
Films set in 2038
Japanese science fiction action films
1980s Japanese-language films
Robot films
Sunrise (company)
Toho tokusatsu films
1980s Japanese films